Allan Havey (born September 19, 1954) is an American stand-up comic and actor. He started his career as a comedian in New York City in 1981.

Overview
Havey made his national debut in 1986 on Late Night with David Letterman and made many appearances on the show throughout the 1980s and 1990s. When Letterman left NBC for CBS after not being chosen to replace Johnny Carson as host of The Tonight Show, Havey was one of several comedians considered by NBC to replace Letterman on Late Night (Conan O'Brien was chosen as Letterman's successor on the latter show).

In November 1989, he was chosen by HBO Downtown Productions to host a show on The Comedy Channel (later known as Comedy Central). The show, Night After Night with Allan Havey, which initially ran for three hours nightly, presented Allan's unique stream of consciousness, celebrity interviews, news and film clips (with commentary), and unusual "on location" scenarios. Havey often recounted stories from his life, sometimes apocryphal or tongue in cheek, sometimes very real, in tandem with his breaking the fourth wall via riffing with those behind the camera, such as producer Sue Fellows or head writer Eddie Gorodetsky. Night After Night became a cult classic among fans. The show also featured the sketch "Audience of One," a "Viewer Mail" segment, "Dave the Weatherman," and announcer Nick Bakay, who left in 1992, to perform the same role on The Dennis Miller Show. Night After Night ran for three years.

In a Vanity Fair interview in April 2016, Havey discussed his long-standing fear of tadpoles and Battenburg cake.

Havey's film roles include Internal Affairs, Checking Out, Rounders, Hancock, Jerry Seinfeld's documentary Comedian, and Steven Soderberg's The Informant! On television, Havey's comedy was featured twice on HBO's One Night Stand; both appearances were nominated for CableACE Awards. As a television actor, Havey has guest starred on Seinfeld, Curb Your Enthusiasm, Punk'd, and The Sarah Silverman Program. In 2006, Havey was cast as a lead in the Fox sitcom Free Ride, where he played Bob Stahlings, father of the main character Nate Stahlings. In 2012, he appeared on Ray Romano's Men of a Certain Age, in Disney's Good Luck Charlie and FX's Louie. In 2013, he was featured on two episodes of The Office</u> and appeared on the AMC show Mad Men. In 2015, he appeared in episodes of the Amazon Studios series The Man in the High Castle and W/ Bob and David on Netflix.

Havey appeared on Ken Reid's TV Guidance Counselor Podcast on April 8, 2015.

Since 2017, Havey has appeared as Karl Allard on Showtime's series "Billions."

Filmography

Film

Television

References

 
 
 
 
 
 Abbott, Jim (November 16, 1993) "Talk-show war correspondents ignored Allan Havey". Chicago Tribune. 
 "CTV`S Allan HAvey Makes The Most of the Night...". Chicago Tribune. May 2, 1991.

External links

 Official Website of Allan Havey

1954 births
American male film actors
American stand-up comedians
Living people
Male actors from St. Louis
Florida State University alumni
20th-century American male actors
21st-century American male actors
Comedians from Missouri
20th-century American comedians
21st-century American comedians